Paragomphus sinaiticus, the Sinai hooktail, is a species of dragonfly in the family Gomphidae. It is found in Egypt, Niger, Oman, Saudi Arabia, Sudan, United Arab Emirates and Yemen. Its natural habitats are rivers and freshwater springs. It is threatened by habitat loss.

References

Gomphidae
Insects described in 1929
Taxonomy articles created by Polbot